The Commission on Higher Education (CHED) is a government agency under the Office of the President of the Philippines. It is responsible for regulating and governing all higher education institutions and post-secondary educational programs in the country.

History
The CHED was established on May 18, 1994 through Republic Act No. 7722 or the Higher Education Act of 1994 authored by Senator Francisco Tatad.

Governance
The CHED is headed by a Chairperson and four Commissioners appointed by the President. The current chairperson, Prospero “Popoy” E. de Vera III, was appointed by Rodrigo Duterte in 2018 and re-appointed by Bongbong Marcos in 2022.

CHED Center of Excellence
The CHED awards Center of Excellence status to departments within higher education institutions that "demonstrate excellent performance in the areas of instruction, research and publication, extension and linkages and institutional qualifications". It also grants Center of Development status to departments that "demonstrate the potential to become a Center of Excellence".

See also
Higher education in the Philippines
Professional Regulation Commission

References

External links

Higher education in the Philippines
Government agencies under the Office of the President of the Philippines
Government agencies established in 1994
Higher education authorities
Regulation in the Philippines